Solitary is the state of being alone or in solitude. The term may refer to:
 shortened form of solitary confinement
 Solitary animal, an animal that does not live with others in its species
 Solitary but social, a type of social organization in biology where individuals forage alone but share sleeping space
 Solitary, the formal title of a hermit in many Christian religious Orders
 "Solitary" (Lost), a 2004 episode of the TV series Lost
 Solitary (TV series), a reality show made by FOX
 Solitary (album), 2008 album by Don Dokken
 Solitary (2020 film), a British sci-fi thriller film
 Solitary (upcoming film), an American drama film
 Solitary ritual, occult practice
 Solitary Mountain, a mountain in Yukon, Canada

See also
 Solitaire (disambiguation)
 Loner